Nejc Pačnik (born October 28, 1990) is a Slovenian diatonic button accordion, an accordion world-champion and accordion teacher.

Early life 
Nejc Pačnik was born on October 28, 1990 in Slovenj Gradec, Slovenia. He attended a primary school located in his hometown Škale and in Velenje. He continued his education at the Wood Secondary School in Slovenj Gradec, Slovenia. His interest in playing a diatonic accordion was raised early since his 4th year when his grandfather Franc showed him the first steps into this instrument and inspired him enormously.

Career
At the age of five, he started taking lessons from Tine Lesjak in Slovenia. After two years, he changed teachers and started learning from Robert Golicnik. At eight, he participated at a remarkable Slovenian Competition "Delcnjak's Memorial" for the first time and won the competition.

At the age of twelve, he participated at a charity concert where he heard the world champion accordionist Robert Gotar for the first time. The same year, under the mentorship of Robert Gotar, he performed at the Slovenian competition "Golden Accordion Award of Ljubečna" where he got into half finals.

He became a European Absolute Champion in Attimis in Italy in 2007. His beginner's competition career proceeded in 2008 when he became an absolute winner of Golden Accordion Award of Ljubecna.

Afterwards, he participated in a world championship and won the 4th place in 2005. Following two years, he won the title of a world vice-champion. In his most successful period of his competition career (in year 2009), he became Junior World-champion in playing a diatonic accordion in Austria. By 2010, he won more than 70th competitions at home and abroad. In 2015, he became an accordion world-champion.

Achievements 
 Absolute World Champion 2015
 Junior World Champion 2009
 World Vice-Champion 2007
 4th place at a World Championship 2005
 European Absolute Champion 2007
 European Champion until age of 18 in 2007
 European Champion until age of 15 in 2005
 2nd place at European Championship in 2006
 3rd place at European Championship in 2004
 Absolute Winner of Golden Accordion Award of Ljubečna in 2008 and 2009
 Audience Winner of Golden Accordion Award of Ljubečna in 2009
 Golden Citation of Golden Accordion Award of Ljubečna in 2007, 2008, 2009 and 2010
 Silver Citation of Golden Accordion Award of Ljubečna  in 2003 and 2006
 Bronze Citation of Golden Accordion Award of Ljubečna in 2004
 1st place at an international competition of Josef Peyer Wettbewerb (Austria)
 1st place until 18 year at a competition »Ruška cottage« in 2006 and 2007
 Absolute Winner of a »Ruška Cottage« in 2007
 1st place and an Absolute Winner of a »Dolič Cup«
 3 times consecutively an Absolute Winner of »Delčnjak's Memorial«
 3 times consecutively an Absolute Winner of »Old Velenje Cup«
 3 times an Absolute Winner of »Mislinja Valley Cup«

References

External links 
 Personal webpage of Nejc Pačnik: https://web.archive.org/web/20160305060215/http://nejcpacnik.com/

1990 births
Slovenian accordionists
Living people
People from Slovenj Gradec
21st-century accordionists